Virgin Holidays Cruises is a company owned by Virgin Group and is part of Virgin Holidays, headquartered in Crawley. The company specialises in package deals with cruises provided by other cruise lines.

The company was established in 2000 as Fast Track Holidays and was acquired by Virgin Holidays for an undisclosed sum in 2007. At the time of the Virgin takeover the company had 80 employees. The company name was officially changed to Virgin Holidays Cruises Limited on 15 June 2009.

References

External links 
 

H
Leisure companies of the United Kingdom
Companies based in Swindon
Transport companies established in 2000
2000 establishments in England